Mary Edith Barnes (9 February 1923 – 29 June 2001) was an English artist and writer with schizophrenia and became a successful painter. She is particularly known for her documentation of her experience at R. D. Laing's experimental therapeutic community at Kingsley Hall, London.
She is referenced in the book The Psychopath Test by Jon Ronson and Thomas Szasz's Schizophrenia.

Life

Early life 
Mary Barnes grew up in Portsmouth, England and then later in the London countryside. Her father was a lab technician and her mother was a homemaker. When Barnes was 18, her brother Peter who was 16 at the time, was committed to a psychiatric ward and diagnosed with Schizophrenia. A few years later he was sent to long-term institutional care.

Nursing career 
Mary Barnes trained as a nurse and joined the army in World War II. In 1945, Barnes spent a year working at hospitals in Egypt and Palestine. She worked in Frankfurt for two years before returning to London as a full-time nurse.

Kingsley Hall 

Barnes had her first psychotic breakdown in 1952. She was admitted to St. Bernard's Hospital and diagnosed with schizophrenia. After a year, Barnes was discharged and returned to working as a nursing tutor.

In 1963, after reading R. D. Laing's book The Divided Self, she contacted him and began therapy. She was admitted to Kingsley Hall as the first patient. This intensified when in 1965 when she underwent regression therapy.  During the process, she discovered a talent for art.  She would later be described as "an ambassador for Laing", emerging from her journey to co-author a book about it with Dr. Joseph Berke, the resident psychiatrist who helped her.

Artistic career 
Barnes's first paintings were done with her own feces on the walls depicting black breasts. Berke later gave her grease crayons which led to Barnes evolving from crayon scribbles, to finger-painting, and lastly led ultimately to oil painting. Her works, vivid oils often depicting religious themes, were first shown at the Camden Arts Centre in 1969. She subsequently became a respected artist, painting evocative works based on her experiences and showing her work on tour worldwide, accompanying it with talks on her experiences and mental health. In 1979 a play was produced, with script by Barnes with David Edgar. This was broadcast on BBC radio in the United Kingdom, most recently in December 2011 on Radio 4 Extra.

In 1985, she moved to Scotland. Something Sacred, her book of conversations, writings and paintings, was published in 1989. In 1993, she moved to Tomintoul, where she died in 2001, aged 78.

In 2010 there was a major retrospective exhibition of Barnes's work at Space studios in London and in 2015 at 
Bow Arts Boo-bah a retrospective co-curated by Dr. Joe Berke of Mary's work on paper and board in pastels and oils alongside photographs chronicling the therapeutic period at nearby Kingsley Hall. The exhibition Boo-Bah refers to a pet name Barnes called Berke in a love letter she wrote which was over a meter high.

Selected works

Small Figure 
Small Figure is a painting which depicts a childlike figure made up of black lines. The black lines are thick and messy as Barnes was encouraged by staff at Kingsley Hall to use her fingers to paint. The figure is shown wearing what seems to be an oversized coat or sweater with the hands peeking out of the large sleeves. The checkered patterned clothing item reaches down past the small child's torso and seems to end right above where the child's knees would be. The figure is placed in the forefront and the feet are placed near the bottom of the paper. The head is tilted slightly to suggest a hunched over position. There are some faint marks coming from darker areas near the head that show wisps of long hair that also cover parts of the head. The face is facing towards the right.

There are a lot of opposing elements such as movement, space, proportion, and color in Small Figure.  Having the child not centered in the space adds to the illusion of the figure along with the coat covered most of the figure's body. The messiness of the strokes brings movement to the work. One can almost imagine the artist hurriedly using her paint-stained fingers to complete the form. There are lines that look like they had been gone over multiple times outlining the sweater and its pattern. The messiest strokes are around the head, face, and hands. The hands look like explosions coming from the sleeves. This movement brings a lot of energy to a figure whose pose does not allude to very much motion at all. In other works such as, Volcanic Eruption, Barnes is known for using a plethora of colors. In Small Figure, however, those colors are absent. Instead, black is the only color added to the white surface of the paper. The movement in the work comes through solely with short quick lines from the artist's fingers. Fingers that move so fast they may look just like the hands in the painting, exploding outwards from the wrists. This movement is confined mostly to the figure and a small space surrounding it giving the viewer a sense of angry tension bubbling right under the surface. Beyond the figure in the background is the clear white sheet untainted by the black energy of the figure. These conflicting elements show the inner struggle with anger and powerlessness the artist may have felt around the time of her painting this work and working on her regressive therapy.

Small Figure is a self portrait of the girl Barnes’ was growing up with her parents. Small under the coat and short on the page it portrays a scene of a small girl hunching over further emphasizing how powerless she felt as a child. The sweater covering her figure and the use of monotone color palette convey a sense of being hidden away in the background. Although the figure doesn't take all the vertical space on the paper, it takes of a majority of the overall space that utilizes perspective to make the viewer see the child from the child's point of view. The artist in her childlike state painted a portrait of her old life at the start of her new life. A resurrection in a way she would go through turmoil to find her inner peace alluding to Jesus's crucifixion.

Publications
 Mary Barnes (play) with David Edgar (1979), published by Methuen Publishing Ltd 
 Something Sacred: Conversations, Writings, Paintings (1989) with Ann Scott, published by Free Association Books,  (hardcover)
 Something Sacred: Conversations, Writings, Paintings (1989) with Ann Scott, published by Free Association Books,   (paperback)
 Two Accounts of a Journey Through Madness (1991) with Joseph Berke, published by Free Association Books,  (paperback)
 Two Accounts of a Journey Through Madness (2002) with Joseph Berke, published by The Other Press,  (hardback)

References

Mary Barnes - Obituary, The Times, London, 9 July 2001.

External links 
 Book Review - Mary Barnes
, tribute site to "Nurse, Madwoman, Explorer of the Underworld, Celebrant of Death and Rebirth, Member of Kingsley Hall Community, Artist, Writer, Healer, Catholic mystic, Visionary"

1923 births
2001 deaths
20th-century English painters
20th-century English women artists
British nurses
English women painters
Outsider artists
Artists from Portsmouth
People with schizophrenia
Women outsider artists